The Battle of Dogger Bank was a naval battle that took place on 5 August 1781 during the Fourth Anglo-Dutch War, contemporaneously related to the American Revolutionary War, in the North Sea. It was a bloody encounter between a British squadron under Vice Admiral Sir Hyde Parker and a Dutch squadron under Vice Admiral Johan Zoutman, both of which were escorting convoys.

Background 

In December 1780, Great Britain declared war on the Dutch Republic, drawing it militarily into the American War of Independence. The Dutch had for several years been supplying the Americans and shipping French supplies to the Americans, in support of the American war effort, the reason behind the British declaration of war. The opening of hostilities with the Dutch meant that Britain's trade with countries on the Baltic Sea—where key supplies of lumber for naval construction were purchased—was potentially at risk, and that the British had to increase protection of their shipping in the North Sea. In order to accomplish this, the British began blockading the Dutch coast to monitor and intercept any significant attempts to send shipping into or out of Dutch ports, and began to protect merchant shipping convoys with armed vessels.

The Dutch were politically in turmoil, and were consequently unable to mount any sort of effective actions against the British. The result of this inaction was the collapse of their economically important trade. It was finally decided that a merchant fleet had to be launched. On 1 August 1781, Admiral Johan Zoutman led a fleet of some 70 merchantmen from the Texel, protected by seven ships of the line as well as a number of frigates and smaller armed vessels. Admiral Sir Hyde Parker was accompanying a convoy of ships from the Baltic when he spotted the sails of the Dutch fleet at 04:00 on the morning of 5 August. He immediately despatched his convoy toward the English coast, and ordered his line to give chase rather than prepare for battle. Zoutman, whose ships had been interspersed with the merchantmen, signalled his line to form in between Parker and the convoy. The ships of Parker's fleet were not in the best of condition, since great demands were placed on the Royal Navy by the demands of the war, and all manner of ships were pressed into service, or did not receive necessary maintenance. Some ships were in such poor condition that the number of guns available to fire was reduced from its normal complement. The ships had had no time to practise the normal fleet manoeuvres. In spite of this, Berwick and Parker's flagship Fortitude, both 74 guns, were both relatively new and in good shape. The Dutch crews were inexperienced as they had not seen any significant action due to the British blockade.

Battle 

With a calm sea and a breeze from the north-east, Zoutman manoeuvred his line onto a port tack, heading south-east by east, and awaited Parker, who held the weather gage. The British fleet closed, raggedly at first due to the poor condition of some of the ships, into a line of battle abreast in accordance with the signal raised at 06:10. Two ships were told to change places, which led to a mistake and placed the Dolphin against one of the largest Dutch ships and the Bienfaisant without an opponent. When Parker raised the battle flag shortly before 08:00, for close action, the British fleet moved closer. Surprisingly, the Dutch ships did not fire as the British approached until the two fleets were about half a musket shot apart. Zoutman then also raised his flag and opened fire, raking the Fortitude with a broadside. Close action ensued, lasting for three hours and 40 minutes. Around mid-morning, the Dutch merchantmen moved away from the action and headed back to Texel. At 11:35, Parker gave the signal to reform his line as the ships had become unmanageable. His fleet dropped to leeward and manoeuvered to reform their line of battle. By this point, both fleets began disengaging from the fighting and sailed for home.

Casualties on both sides were high, considering the number of ships involved. Fewer casualties were suffered, for example, in the battle of the Chesapeake, fought a month later between fleets more than twice as large. The British reported their losses at 104 killed and 339 wounded, while the Dutch reported their losses at 142 killed and 403 wounded. While Dutch losses from the battle were well documented, naval historian William Laird Clowes noted that certain unconfirmed reports suggested that the Dutch casualties were actually much higher, possibly reaching 1100 killed and wounded. The heavily damaged Holland slowly sank due to damage sustained during the battle after its conclusion. The  came upon her, and her colours, which was kept flying, was captured and gifted to Parker as a spoil of war.

Aftermath 
Both sides claimed victory, but it was a tactical draw since no ships were lost on either side during the battle, and both convoys escaped. However, strategically, the battle was a British victory since the Dutch fleet retreated to Texel and did not leave harbour again during the war. In addition, Dutch merchant trade remained crippled by the constant capture of their merchantmen by British privateers. At least one convoy made it to the Baltic, but it flew under the Swedish flag and was accompanied by a Swedish frigate.

Parker, on his return, considered that he had not been properly equipped for his task. On arrival at the Nore, met King George III and told him: "I wish Your Majesty better ships and younger officers. As for myself, I am now too old for the service". He then resigned his command.

In the Dutch Republic, however, the battle was celebrated as a victory. The last major battle the Dutch fleet had fought before the Battle of Dogger Bank was the Battle of Málaga in 1704, and now the Dutch fleet had fared well against the British fleet. The Dutch commanders were showered with praise and a wave of enthusiasm erupted in the Dutch Republic. The fact that the battle had failed to change the strategic situation was ignored.

Order of battle

British

Ships of the line 
 , 74 guns – Captain John Ferguson
 , 44 guns – Captain William Blair
 , 60 guns – Captain William Truscott
 , 74 guns – Captain George Robertson, Parker's flag
 , 80 guns – Captain John Macartney
 , 50 guns – Captain Alexander Graeme
 , 64 guns – Captain Richard Brathwaite

Other vessels with the fleet 
 , 40 guns, fifth rate – Captain John MacBride
 , 38 guns, fifth rate – Captain Hyde Parker
 , 36 guns, fifth rate – Captain Philip Patton
 , 32 guns, fifth rate – Captain George Murray
 , 14 guns, cutter – Lieutenant Peter Rivett

With the convoy 
 , 32 guns, fifth rate – Captain Charles Hope
 , 28 guns, sixth rate – Captain Robert Sutton
 Cabot, 14 guns, brig – Commander Henry Cromwell
 , 14 guns, cutter – Commander James Vashon
 , 20 guns, armed ship – Commander Peter Rothe
 , 14 guns, cutter – Lieutenant William Furnivall
 , 14 guns, cutter – Lieutenant J. B. Swan

Source:

Dutch

Ships of the line 
 Erfprins, 54 guns – Captain A. Braak – 8 killed and 30 wounded
 Admiraal Generaal, 74 guns – Commodore Jan Hendrik van Kinsbergen – 7 killed and 41 wounded
 Argo, Frigate, 44 guns – Captain A. C. Staering – 24 killed and 75 wounded
 , 54 guns – Captain W. J. Bentinck – 18 killed and 49 wounded
 Admiraal de Ruijter, 68 guns – Captain Staringh, Zoutman's flagship – 44 killed and 87 wounded
 Admiraal Piet Hein, 54 guns – Captain W. van Braam – 10 killed and 58 wounded
 Holland, 68 guns – Captain S. Dedel (sank after battle) – 25 killed and 45 wounded

Other vessels with the fleet 
 Bellona, 36 guns – Captain Haringcarspel Decker
 Dolfijn, 24 guns – Captain Mulder
 Ajax, 20 guns – Captain Grave van Welderen
 Eensgezindheit, 36 guns – Captain Bouritius
 Zephijr, 36 guns – Captain Wiertz
 Amphitrite, 36 guns – Captain van Woensel

With the convoy 
 Medemblik, 36 guns – Captain van Rijneveld
 Venus, 24 guns – Captain Grave van Regteren
 Spion, 16 guns – Commander Stutzer
 Zwaluw, 10 guns – Commander Butger

Notes

References

Bibliography

 Allen, Joseph, Battles of the British navy, Volume 1 H. G. Bohn, London,(1852)
 Blok, Petrus Johannes. History of the People of the Netherlands
 Clowes, Sir William Laird (1898). The Royal Navy: a history from the earliest times to the present, Volume 3
 Davies, Charles Maurice. The history of Holland and the Dutch nation, Volume 3
 
 Penrose, John (1850). of Vice-Admiral Sir Charles Vinicombe Penrose, K. C. B., and Captain Trevenen''. J. Murray (publisher), Harvard University.

External links 
 

1781 in Europe
Conflicts in 1781
Military history of the North Sea
Naval battles involving Great Britain
Naval battles involving the Dutch Republic
Naval battles of the Fourth Anglo-Dutch War